Luis Rosito (born 25 March 1951) is a Guatemalan weightlifter. He competed in the men's middle heavyweight event at the 1980 Summer Olympics.

References

1951 births
Living people
Guatemalan male weightlifters
Olympic weightlifters of Guatemala
Weightlifters at the 1980 Summer Olympics
Place of birth missing (living people)